Jerzy Zdziechowski (27 August 1880 – 25 April 1975) was a Polish politician, economist and economical activist, author of economical works.

Zdziechowski was born in Rozdół, Podolia Governorate. During the years of 1917 and 1918 he was one of the leaders of Rada Polska Zjednoczenia Międzypartyjnego in Russia. There, he co-organised Polish Corps in Russia. In 1919 he was one of the main participants in an unsuccessful Polish coup attempt.

From 1922 to 1927, Zdziechowski was a Popular National Union deputy to the Sejm. From 1925 to 1926 he was the Minister of Finance of Poland in the Aleksander Skrzyński cabinet. He elaborated economic programme which realisation caused resignation of the Polish Socialist Party ruling coalition, and as a result of that, break-up and fall of the cabinet. In 1926–1933 Zdziechowski was a member of the Council of the Camp of Great Poland. In 1926 Zdziechowski was brutally beaten by unidentified men in his own house in Warsaw. The perpetrators were dressed in uniforms, and their identity was never discovered. Some political commentators indirectly accused Józef Piłsudski of ordering to intimidate Zdziechowski. After 1939 he was an activist of economical organisations.

Zdziechowski emigrated from the country in September 1939. After World War II he became a chairman of Executive Department of the Political Council in London as a National Party member.

He died in Kraków.

References

 
 

1880 births
1975 deaths
People from Kirovohrad Oblast
People from Baltsky Uyezd
People from the Russian Empire of Polish descent
20th-century Polish nobility
National League (Poland) members
Popular National Union politicians
National Party (Poland) politicians
Camp of Great Poland politicians
Finance Ministers of Poland
Government ministers of Poland
Members of the Polish National Committee (1914–1917)
Members of the Sejm of the Second Polish Republic (1922–1927)
People of the Polish May Coup (pro-government side)
Polish economists